Vīksna Parish is an administrative unit of Balvi Municipality in the Latgale region of Latvia.

Towns, villages and settlements of Vīksna Parish 

Balvi Municipality
Parishes of Latvia
Latgale